Crayon Fields is a four-piece Melbourne-based music group signed to the labels Chapter Music and Rallye. They have been described as lo-fi with an artful naïve-pop aesthetic.

Members 
The line-up consists of singer-songwriter Geoffrey O'Connor on vocals and guitar, Brett Hudson on bass guitar, Chris Hung on second guitar, synthesizer and percussion, and Neil Erenstrom on drums. O'Connor also has a solo side-project known as Sly Hats and is signed to Nervous Jerk Records with one album to date: Liquorice Night. He has since dropped the 'Sly Hats' moniker and has begun recording and performing his solo material using his name.

History 
Their group released their debut studio album Animal Bells on 16 October 2006. It was given a rating of 7.8/10 by Pitchfork Media and was compared to the likes of The Beach Boys, The Zombies and The Association.  

Their second album, All the Pleasures of the World was released in September 2009 and was given a 7.8/10 by Pitchfork Media. 

In March 2010 Crayon Fields toured the US for the first time, performing in New York, LA and Austin as part of the SXSW festival, which included a live-to-air set for KEXP radio. In Australia Crayon Fields have performed at the Big Day Out, Golden Plains, Parklife and Laneway festivals and have toured with Peter Bjorn and John, Cornelius, The New Pornographers, The Dirty Three, Stereolab, The Mountain Goats, Spoon, The Go! Team and Built To Spill. They toured the US for a second time in October 2010 and played at CMJ festival shows.

Discography

Albums

EPs

References

Australian indie pop groups